Eli T. is a Singaporean electropop artist. He is also an established producer, arranger and singer-songwriter who has worked for Chynahouse Recordings (EMI Asia) earlier in his career.

In 2012, he released his debut album, 'Revolt', with Assassins Records, a subsidiary of a Singaporean media group, Assassins Pte. Ltd.

Early career

Eli T. also made his theatre-stage debut in Singapore's hit summer play, "Beauty Kings". Written by veteran entertainer Dick Lee, Eli was cast as the "himbo" part-time model, "Don", Eli T. played the role throughout the 15-show run. Eli T. was also cast for an episode in the second season of hit TV-series "Point of Entry". The show is filmed and broadcast by Singapore's television station, Mediacorp.

Music career

Eli T. worked and produced tracks for Disney (Asian-version remix of High School Musical's theme song "Breaking Free"), Wang Lee Hom (multi-platinum-selling Taiwan artiste), Will Pan (Multi-platinum-selling Taiwan artiste) and The Gorillaz (unreleased EMI remix of their smash hit "Feel Good Inc.").   Attempting to explore how music could be used for Education, Eli left the label and started his production company Zai Studios. And in late 2009, Eli had his first major hit song.

Revolt
Eli T. finally decided to launch his debut album, Revolt, on 11 March 2012 in conjunction with the Mosaic Music Festival, and has since performed for the closing show at both Men's Fashion Week Asia and The Singapore Arts Festival.

'Revolt' has garnered Eli T. 2 nominations (Best Solo Artist and Best Singer / Songwriter) in Hollywood's Artists in Music Awards 2012, 1 nomination (Best Electronic Artist) at the Ontario New Music Awards 2012 (Ontario, CA) and 1 nomination (Best Electronic Artist) at the Toronto Independent Music Awards 2012 (Ontario, CA), along with critical acclaim from industry experts the world over.

The album 'Revolt', led to The Revolt Tour, which was mainly planned around the international festivals that Eli T. had been invited to perform at. The tour will be making stops in Singapore, New Zealand, Canada and the United States of America over the year 2012.

Awards

Discography
Albums
Revolt: Released 11 March 2012

 Intro
 Dancin' With Fire
 Hear Me
 Fallen
 Imaginary
 Fade Away
 Gibberish
 Thunder
 Interlude
 A Love Like This
 L-Over
 Prototype
 Hear Me (Remix)
 Fallen (Acoustic Mix)

Revolt was written, arranged and produced by Eli T., except for collaborations with Natasha and Malcolm for the lyrics of 'Fade Away', DJ Hoo.Da.Man on 'Hear Me (Remix)', and Justin Low for the co-arrangement (Guitar) for 'Fallen (Acoustic Mix)'

EPs
Key to My Life: Released 2006

References

1982 births
Living people
Singaporean musicians